Antonio Serrano Sánchez (born 8 March 1965 in La Solana, Ciudad Real) is a retired Spanish long-distance runner who specialized in the 10.000 metres and road running.

Achievements

Personal bests
3.000 metres - 7:47.73 (13/09/1989, Jerez de la Frontera)
5.000 metres - 13:22.40 (30/05/1991, Sevilla)
10.000 metres - 27:47.33 (20/06/1993, Hengelo)
Half marathon - 1:01:30 (28/03/1998, Den Haag)
Marathon - 2h09:13 (25/09/1994, Berlin)

References
 
 

1965 births
Living people
Spanish male long-distance runners
Athletes (track and field) at the 1988 Summer Olympics
Athletes (track and field) at the 1992 Summer Olympics
Olympic athletes of Spain
World Athletics Championships athletes for Spain
Universiade medalists in athletics (track and field)
People from Ciudad Real
Sportspeople from the Province of Ciudad Real
Universiade gold medalists for Spain
Universiade bronze medalists for Spain
Medalists at the 1989 Summer Universiade
Medalists at the 1993 Summer Universiade